Diego Caballero (died 1560) was a Spanish merchant and minor Conquistador in the Caribbean area and in the islands off the coast of Venezuela. He organised raids on natives, whom he then used as slaves in pearl fishing and other enterprises. He amassed enormous wealth in America, which he invested in further enterprises throughout the Spanish Empire. He thus became enormously wealthy, perhaps the most important Spanish merchant of his day. He held, or purchased, several official posts, in the service of the King, Charles V and in Seville.

Early life
He was born at the end of the Fifteenth Century in Guadalupe, Spain, the son of Pedro Caballero and Catalina de Villegas. In early March 1517, taking advantage of the fact that his cousin Hernando Caballero was Mayor of Santo Domingo, he got permission to emigrate there, along with his brother Alonso. He came of a well-off noble background, so he managed to get various official posts on the island.

He was immediately appointed to the Royal Audiencia of Santo Domingo, the first Royal court of justice there. Thanks to this, his commercial and political influence spread along the coast of Tierra Firma from Santa Marta to the island of Trinidad. He was a  man of many talents, and had the rank of a Knight Twenty-Four (or alderman) of the city of Seville, a post reserved to those of noble descent. He put in charge of the finances of Hispaniola, and was its military governor. He ran several private enterprises there.

After a time, Diego Caballero resigned all his official posts and dedicated himself entirely to shipping and commerce on both sides of the Atlantic.

Slaver and Merchant
He obtained a licence, under the supervision of an "Oidor" (Judge) of the ‘’Royal Audiencia’’, to put together a fleet and set about capturing native Indians along the coast of Venezuela, between  Cabo de San Román and Cabo de la Vela - some several hundred leagues - and in the adjacent islands . This enslavement of Indians was justified by claiming they had refused conversion to Christianity, or were practicing cannibalism.

It seems that he gave up this dubious trade after a year, either for fear of the Laws of the Indies, which forbade such enslavement, or because of a guilty conscience. He turned away from raiding the Indians' properties and chasing Indians on the Venezuelan coast. Meanwhile, the Crown Representatives, Diego Colon and Rodrigo de Figueroa, authorised Juan de Ampies to occupy the Venezuelan cost of Santa Ana de Coro and the islands of Aruba and Curaçao, with the object of "protecting" and "pacifying" the Indians, and moreover of teaching them Christianity and inducting them into a more "organised way of life".

Ship-owner and Merchant
Following his slaving activities, Caballero took over some pearl fisheries. He also bought four ships and 

sent his brother Alonso to Seville, where he appointed him his agent and factor. He then began to send precious woods to Seville, as well as precious metals and pearls and other precious materials found abundantly in the Caribbean islands of Cubagua and Isla Margarita. In return, his ships came back from Spain laden with textiles and various tools, implements and other useful products of Spain. As the economic and commercial structure developed and there was a need for people you could trust to manage the various enterprises, including the many voyages of his ships, he took on many of his fellow countrymen, including a nephew, Francisco Caballero, whom he appointed to run the pearl fisheries at Cabo de la Vela.

High Ambitions
Once the management of his businesses had been well organised and put in the competent hands of friends and relatives, he signed, on 4 August 1525, an agreement with the King, Charles V, Holy Roman Emperor (Charles I of Spain), for the exploration of the territory corresponding to the Venezuela Province, from Cabo de San Román to Cabo de la Vela.

The rich banking families of the Fuggers and the Welsers, being informed of the prosperity his various enterprises, managed to prevent him becoming Governor of Venezuela.

Continued Growth
Before this setback, Diego increased the size of his fleet of ships, opened further commercial sea routes and launched new pearl fisheries in Cubagua, Cabo de la Vela and Panama.

The Church would demand better treatment of the defenceless native divers, and Diego, as a "good Christian", ordered that his divers should hear Mass before diving and that they should marry their local woman, so that they would be less in danger, and moreover they would, while not offending God, populate the earth. An odd but inexpensive method of increasing the number of divers. He further ordered that his "pearly flock" be given more good food, plus a  half pint of wine a day, shirts, shorts, shoes and hammocks, or straw beds, so they could sleep comfortably, and that they should lack nothing, so that God and man were seen to be served.

Return to Spain
In 1535, he returned to Spain permanently, settling in Seville. He bought himself into the City Council, by becoming a Veintiquatro, thus displaying his enormous wealth. He continued to trade with the Americas, and extended his entrepreneurial activities into wine, oil, textiles and slavery, across Spain and its Empire, including Flanders.

Retirement
On reaching old age, he decided to retire from commercial activity and, with the enormous profits he had made from the Indians, to settle comfortably in Seville, where he dedicated himself to charity and the promotion of good works. Every year, in compliance with his promise, he visited the Sanctuary of Guadalupe in Extremadura to thank the Virgin for what she had done for him and to pray for his family and for the salvation of his soul.

Recalling his early slaving adventures, the way in which he had amassed so much Indian gold without having found the mythical El Dorado, he asked God to forgive him his sins, and, on 27 November 1560,  praying for the souls of his pearl-divers, he rendered up his own soul, in the peace and prosperity he had brought to Seville.

References
 Otte, Enrique, Diego Caballero, funcionario de la Casa de la Contratación, in Antonio Acosta Rodríguez, et al. La Casa de la Contratación y la Navegación entre España y las Indias  Universidad de Sevilla 2003  
 Otte, Enrique et al. Sevilla, siglo XVI: materiales para su historia económica  Centro de Estudios Andaluces Sevilla 2008  
 Las perlas del Caribe: Nueva Cádiz de Cubagua, Enrique Otte, Fundación John Boulton, Caracas 1977  
 Recopilación historial de Venezuela, Fray Pedro de Aguado, Tomo I, Biblioteca de la Academia Nacional de  la Historia, Venezuela.  

1560 deaths
Spanish explorers of South America
16th-century Spanish businesspeople
16th-century explorers
Colonial Venezuela
Year of birth unknown
People of the Colony of Santo Domingo
Spanish merchants